Temple Israel is a Reform synagogue in the American city of Boston, Massachusetts. Founded in 1854 as Adath Israel, the congregation is the largest Reform synagogue in Boston and New England.

History

 1854: The congregation Temple Israel, originally known as Adath Israel, was founded when Jews of German ancestry seceded from Ohabei Shalom, then the sole synagogue in Boston, because so many Polish Jews had joined the congregation. The congregation immediately renovated a house on Pleasant Street for use as a synagogue.
 1859: Purchase of land in Wakefield, Massachusetts, for a cemetery.
 1885: Dedication of Columbus Avenue synagogue building: Indicative of the growing size and wealth of congregation, influence of its members and leaders. This building was designed by architects Weissbein & Jones.
 1894: Founding of Auxiliary Society – This society was the first internal temple organization dedicated to social service, cultural activity, education, and social functions.
 1907: Dedication of Commonwealth Avenue Temple built by Clarence Blackall: Attended by prominent Jewish and political leaders, the dedication of the new temple building demonstrates the growing size of the congregation, as well as the rising influence of its members and leaders in the community.
 1911–1939: Installation of Rabbi Harry Levi led to changes within the religious school by implementing new policies such as paying teachers, establishing branch schools, and refocusing the curriculum on more traditional Jewish subjects.
 1913: First Congregational Seder: "For the first time we liberal Jews indicated that we wanted to participate in old Pesach traditions with our own version," Abram Vossen Goodman. This seder was the first to follow the Reform-sponsored Union Haggadah.
 1924: Radio Broadcasts: Rabbi Levi's first radio broadcasts of sermons launched a new era of interfaith educational efforts by taking advantage of Levi's "genius for selling Judaism to Christians," his speaking ability, and advances in radio technology led to his being known as the "Radio Rabbi."
 1923–1927: New Meeting House: The building of a new meeting house represented the congregation's commitment to Jewish education, social and cultural activities, and its growing membership.
 1950s & 1960s: Social Action Committee: With his installation in 1954, Rabbi Gittelsohn brought a new commitment to social action to Temple Israel during his tenure. Some important projects included the Boston Ruleville Interfaith Committee (BRIC), and Rev. Martin Luther King's visit to Boston in 1965.
 1969–1971: Israel Week/Expo Israel: These celebrations demonstrate Temple Israel's new connection with Israel, its heritage, and its current political plight.
 1972: Installation of Murray Simon as the Temple's First Cantor.
 1973: Completion of a new sanctuary as part of the expanded Riverway campus. Sculpture, Sky Covenant commissioned by Jewish sculptor Louise Nevelson placed in front of entrance.
 1977: Rabbi Mehlman becomes senior rabbi and remains in this position until 1999.
 1986: First openly gay family joins the congregation of Temple Israel.
 1990: Rabbi Elaine Zecher becomes the first female Rabbi at Temple Israel.
 1999: Rabbi Ronne Friedman succeeds Rabbi Mehlman as Senior Rabbi.
 2004: 150th Anniversary of Temple Israel; after Massachusetts becomes the first state to legalize gay marriage, gay marriage ceremonies are held at Temple Israel.
 2009: Publication of Becoming American Jews: Temple Israel of Boston by Meaghan Dwyer-Ryan, Susan L. Porter, and Lisa Fagin Davis (Waltham: Brandeis University Press, 2009).
 2016: Rabbi Elaine Zecher became the senior rabbi of the congregation, the first woman to hold that post. She had served the temple for 26 years previously.  She succeeded Rabbi Ronne Friedman, who had become the senior rabbi in 1999, who had in turn succeeded Rabbi Bernard Mehlman.
 2020: Cantor Alicia Stillman succeeds Roy Einhorn, who became emeritus after 27 years, becoming the first woman to hold the post

Tikkun Central
Tikkun Central is the umbrella for all justice and compassion activities at Temple Israel, whether directed inward toward the Temple Israel community or outward towards the larger communities within which Temple Israel resides.

Community Life

Center for Adult Jewish Learning at Temple Israel of Boston

Religious School (Pre-K through 7) 
Temple Israel offers a supplemental education program with classes for Pre-K through 7th graders.

On-Site Resources

Temple Israel Archives 
Temple Israel is the second oldest congregation in the Boston area, and the largest Reform congregation in New England. Founded in 1854 in Boston, its long history follows the rise of the local Jewish community. The Temple Israel Archives serves as the repository for records, documents, publications, and images relating to the history and administration of Temple Adath Israel of Boston. These records document the congregational history and provide primary source material to assist the clergy, staff, and members of the synagogue. The Archives also serve as a resource for researchers who are interested in the history of Boston's Jewish community, or in family research.

Wyner Museum 
The Wyner Museum was reopened in 1984 to house the Temple Israel Judaica collection.

Dr. Arnold L. Segel Library Center 
The library, named in memory of Temple member Dr. Arnold L. Segel, has over 20,000 books, audio- and visual-recordings, books on CD, journals and newspapers on Jewish subjects ranging from Bible to Zohar (mystical text). Temple Israel members, students, and staff may borrow materials from the library. The library is open to the public for reading and research on site. The librarian, who has over 25 years of experience, and her staff are available to help with individual research projects, and can help you find resources on any topic from just about any location, physical or virtual. The library is a member of the Massachusetts Library System's Inter-Library Loan program.

Clergy

Senior Rabbis

Past clergy 
 Samuel Wolk, 1923–1929
 Lawrence W. Schwartz, 1929–1930
 Beryl D. Cohon, 1930–1939
 Leo. A. Bergman, 1940–1942
 David B. Alpert, 1943–1946
 Albert A. Goldman, 1946–1948
 Irving A. Mandel, 1948–1950
 Earl A. Grollman, 1950–1951
 Maurice L. Zigmund, 1951–1954
 Leon A. Jick, 1954–1957
 Robert W. Shapiro, 1957–1960
 Charles A. Kroloff, 1960–1963
 Harvey J. Fields, 1963–1968
 Larry J. Halpern, 1967–1970
 Frank M. Waldorf, 1968–1971
 Paul J. Menitoff, 1970–1973
 James B. Rosenberg, 1971–1974
 Murray Simon (cantor), 1972–1983
 Paul J. Citrin, 1974–1983
 Ronne Friedman, 1978–1994
 Jeffrey A. Perry-Marx, 1983–1985
 William L. Berkowitz, 1985–1990
 Ruth Alpers, 1994–1999
 Jonah D. Pesner, 1999–2006
 Stephanie Kolin, 2006–2010
 Jeremy Morrison, 2001–2016
 Roy Einhorn (cantor), 1983–2020

Architecture

1885 building
In 1884–1885, the congregation erected the oldest purpose-built synagogue that remains standing in Massachusetts. The Rundbogenstil building, with twin towers and a rose window in the form of a Magen David stands at 600 Columbus Avenue, at the corner of Northampton. Today, it is the African Methodist Episcopal Zion Church.

1906 building
In 1906, the congregation moved to a new building that is now the Morse Auditorium of Boston University.

1926 building
In 1926, the congregation began work on a new temple, on the Riverway at Longwood Avenue in Roxbury, just across the Muddy River from Brookline.  The "monumental",  Classical building was planned to have an enormous, domed sanctuary, with flanking wings.  Only the west wing, about one-fifth of the planned space, was completed before the stock market crash of 1929.

1973 building
The auditorium and religious school on Longwood Avenue were supplemented by a new, modernist sanctuary.  Outside on the Riverway was an original abstract sculpture by Louise Nevelson, Sky Covenant.

See also

 List of the oldest synagogues in the United States
 Sites of interest in Boston

References

External links
 , the official website of the Temple Israel congregation

Ashkenazi Jewish culture in Massachusetts
German-American culture in Massachusetts
German-Jewish culture in the United States
Reform synagogues in Massachusetts
Synagogues completed in 1885
Synagogues completed in 1905
Synagogues completed in 1926
Rundbogenstil synagogues
Synagogues in Boston
Religious organizations established in 1854
1854 establishments in Massachusetts